is a former Japanese football player.

Playing career
Sato was born in Yamagata Prefecture on February 4, 1975. He played for his local club Montedio Yamagata. He played many matches as regular center back until 2000. However he could hardly play in the match in 2001 and retired end of 2001 season.

Club statistics

References

External links

1975 births
Living people
Association football people from Yamagata Prefecture
Japanese footballers
J2 League players
Montedio Yamagata players
Association football defenders